Ursula Happe (20 October 1926 – 26 March 2021) was a German swimmer and Olympic champion. She competed at the 1956 Olympic Games in Melbourne, where she won the gold medal in 200 m breaststroke. She also competed in the women's 200 metre breaststroke at the 1952 Summer Olympics. Happe died in Dortmund on 26 March 2021 at the age of 94.

Her son Thomas Happe is a former international handball player for West Germany.

See also
 List of members of the International Swimming Hall of Fame

References

External links

1926 births
2021 deaths
Sportspeople from Gdańsk
People from the Free City of Danzig
German female breaststroke swimmers
Olympic swimmers of Germany
Olympic swimmers of the United Team of Germany
Swimmers at the 1952 Summer Olympics
Swimmers at the 1956 Summer Olympics
Olympic gold medalists for Germany
German female butterfly swimmers
European Aquatics Championships medalists in swimming
Medalists at the 1956 Summer Olympics
Olympic gold medalists in swimming